Zvyozdochka is the name of several inhabited localities in Russia.

Urban localities
Zvyozdochka, Sakha Republic, an urban-type settlement in Ust-Maysky District of the Sakha Republic

Rural localities
Zvyozdochka, Irkutsk Oblast, a settlement in Angarsky District of Irkutsk Oblast
Zvyozdochka, Krasnodar Krai, a khutor in Krasnoselsky Rural Okrug of Kushchyovsky District in Krasnodar Krai; 

Industry
Zvezdochka (company) shipbuilding yard , repair .